Derek P. Griffith (born February 9, 1997) is an American professional stock car racing driver. He last competed part-time in the NASCAR Xfinity Series, driving the No. 26 Toyota Supra for Sam Hunt Racing. Griffith has also competed in the ARCA Menards Series and super late model racing, winning the 2018 Pro All Stars Series national championship.

Racing career
In his early years, Griffith raced at Hudson Speedway in New Hampshire, running four-cylinder cars. While in the kids' division at Hudson, Griffith was nicknamed "The Rock Star" for his long-haired appearance. 

He moved up from four-cylinders to super late models (SLMs) in 2012 and ran full-time in the Granite State Pro Stock Series in 2014. He won the 2015 GSPSS championship. In 2016, Griffith returned to the GSPSS, won the DAV Fall Classic at Seekonk Speedway and claimed his first career Pro All Stars Series (PASS) win. Griffith claimed two PASS North victories in 2017.

In 2018, Griffith won the PASS North Icebreaker at Thompson Speedway Motorsports Park, and claimed the PASS national championship. The majority of the title run was contested with a Lefthander chassis more than a decade old. He also started racing more outside of New Hampshire, venturing to South Carolina and Florida.

In 2019, he held on to the PASS North points lead until the final race, when DJ Shaw overtook Griffith. He also acquired a new Fury Race Cars SLM chassis to race at the Snowball Derby, as Griffith's main chassis was not well suited for Florida rules variations. Griffith also took part in the Kulwicki Driver Development Program in 2019, and won Oktoberfest at Lee USA Speedway.

Griffith scored the cumulative title at the 2020 World Series of Asphalt. Chad Bryant Racing later signed Griffith to make his ARCA Menards Series East debut in the season-opening Skip's Western Outfitters 175. The drive came after Griffith meeting with CBR crew chief Paul Andrews through the Kulwicki Driver Development Program. He won the pole for the race. After finishing second in his debut race, Griffith and CBR secured enough funding to run a full East schedule in 2020. Due to the COVID-19 pandemic, CBR and Griffith discontinued their full-season East effort after one race and started running part-time in the national ARCA Menards Series. He continued racing super late models in 2020, winning Granite State Nationals at Claremont Motorsports Park in September. A weekend after that, Griffith won the Freedom 300 and associated $10,000 paycheck at Lee USA Speedway. He also continued to make appearances in the Granite State Pro Stock Series.

For 2021, Griffith remained in ARCA for another part-time schedule and moved from Chad Bryant Racing (which closed down and merged their ARCA operations into GMS Racing for 2021) to Venturini Motorsports. He drove their No. 55 Toyota in two races, which were the season-opener at Daytona as well as Kansas in May. Griffith would also drive for the team in ARCA's Daytona test session in January before the start of the season.

On July 1, 2021, Kyle Busch Motorsports announced that Griffith would make his NASCAR Camping World Truck Series debut at World Wide Technology Raceway driving the No. 51.

Personal life
Griffith attended Alvirne High School.

Motorsports career results

NASCAR
(key) (Bold – Pole position awarded by qualifying time. Italics – Pole position earned by points standings or practice time. * – Most laps led.)

Xfinity Series

Camping World Truck Series

 Season still in progress
 Ineligible for series points

ARCA Menards Series
(key) (Bold – Pole position awarded by qualifying time. Italics – Pole position earned by points standings or practice time. * – Most laps led.)

ARCA Menards Series East

References

External links
 

Living people
1997 births
Racing drivers from New Hampshire
ARCA Menards Series drivers
People from Hudson, New Hampshire
Kyle Busch Motorsports drivers